Raimo Olavi Toivonen (born 1953) is a Finnish developer of speech analysis, speech synthesis, speech technology, psychoacoustics and digital signal processing.

Toivonen studied at the Tampere University of Technology (TUT), where he obtained a Diploma Engineer in Electrical Engineering in 1979.

The development of speech synthesis 

The development of speech synthesis began in 1975 at TUT; in 1976, it was moved to the VTT Technical Research Centre of Finland in Tampere, and again to the TUT electronics department in 1978, where it remained until 1981. Toivonen joined in January 1977.

Intelligent Speech Analyser (ISA) 

The first presentation of the Intelligent Speech Analyser (ISA) (by Toivonen) took place in January 1987 at the Finnish Phonetics Meeting at Jyväskylä University. Work started in 1985 and has continued since then.

Publications using ISA 

In 100 academic theses, 27 of which are academic dissertations, spoken languages have been studied with the help of the ISA developed by Toivonen. There are a total of almost 500 publications. Using ISA, 14 spoken or written languages have been researched. These are Finnish, Swedish, Estonian, Icelandic, Hungarian, Polish, Czech, German, Russian, English, French, Greek, Portuguese and Spanish.

Earlier works 
Research project of the Academy of Finland, Development of communication tools for the sensory impaired:

 Rahko, Tapani & Karjalainen, Matti & Laine, Unto & Toivonen, Raimo & Karma, Pekka: Clinical Applications of the Experiences with a Portable, Unlimited Text-to-Speech Synthesizer, Ear and Hearing, 1981;2:4:177–179. .
 Karjalainen, M.A. & Laine, U.K. & Toivonen, R.O.: Aids for the handicapped based on "Synte 2" speech synthesizer, ICASSP '80. IEEE International Conference on Acoustics, Speech, and Signal Processing, 1980;5:851–854. .
 Karjalainen Matti A. & Laine, Unto K. & Lavonen, Seppo & Toivonen, Raimo O.: ,  (Development of communication tools for the sensory impaired, Final report, Chapter 4, From speech synthesis research), Report 12, Finnish Technical Research Center, Laboratory of Biomedical Engineering, Tampere, 165 pages, 1979. .
 Toivonen Raimo O.:  (An audio-visual computer terminal for blind programmers), Tampere University of Technology, Department of Electronics, Finland, 1979. (Master's Thesis in Technology)

A three-part series of articles:

 Toivonen, Raimo:  (The microprocessor came and stayed 1. Synthetic speech helps the visually impaired). Finnish news magazine Aamulehti February 12, 1980. s. 6.
 Toivonen, Raimo:  (The microprocessor came and stayed 2. Books and magazines are made to talk). Aamulehti February 13, 1980. s. 8.
 Toivonen, Raimo:  (The microprocessor came and stayed 3. In the 1980s, computers were made to talk). Aamulehti February 14, 1980. s. 8.

Articles in the Finnish microprocessor magazine :

 Toivonen, Raimo:  (The talking machine makes audio books), in  6/1979, s. 32–38.
 Toivonen, Raimo:  (The talking machine answers the phone), in  8/1979.
 Toivonen, Raimo:  (The talking terminal is still evolving), in  2/1980.
 Toivonen, Raimo:  (Audiovisual word processing device – 1980s microprocessor technology), in  3/1980.

Research project of the Academy of Finland, Auditory modelling of speech perception:

 Karjalainen Matti A. (eds.):  (Auditory modelling of speech perception), Helsinki University of Technology, Acoustics laboratory, Finland, 110 pages, 1987. .

Gallery

See also 

Matti Antero Karjalainen
Aatto Sonninen

References

External links 

 
  
  Participants 1976-1978 with the highest possible 5/5 grades: Tapio Saramäki, currently professor emeritus, Markku Renfors, currently professor emeritus and Raimo Toivonen.

1953 births
Living people
People from Kankaanpää
Finnish inventors
Speech processing researchers
Tampere University of Technology alumni